Toma Prošev (1931–1996) was a Macedonian composer and professor.

Education
He completed his postgraduate studies at the Ljubljana Music Academy under Prof. L.M. Škerjanc and under Nadia Boulanger in Paris.
In 1968, Prošev founded the Saint Sophia Ensemble for Contemporary Music in Skopje. In 1981 he began his doctorate in musicology at the Sarajevo Music Academy.

References

1931 births
1996 deaths
Macedonian composers
Male composers
20th-century composers
Yugoslav composers
20th-century male musicians